Real Sociedad de Fútbol "C" is a Spanish football team based in San Sebastián, in the autonomous community of Basque Country. It is the second reserve team of Real Sociedad and plays in Segunda Federación – Group 2.

History
Founded in 1998 as Club Deportivo Berio Futbol Taldea, in 2016 the team was integrated fully into the structure of Real Sociedad, becoming its second reserve squad. In the previous two seasons, after gaining promotion to the Tercera División, Berio operated as a farm team for Real Sociedad but still played at their own stadium wearing their traditional green kit. From then on, they would play at Zubieta and wear Real Sociedad blue-and-white colours. 
 
In general, the Real C squad consists graduates from the club's youth system aged between 17 and 20, and successful players will move up to Real Sociedad B (Sanse) after one or two seasons. The Real Sociedad C team must play at least one division below Sanse, who must themselves play one division lower than the main Real Sociedad team. Neither reserve team can enter the Copa del Rey.

In 2021, the team achieved a promotion of sorts, finishing second in their Tercera group to move to the Segunda División RFEF, one of only three teams in the Basque group to do so – as this was part of a nationwide restructuring they would remain in the fourth level, though now with a regional rather than a local profile. In the same season, the Real B-team gained promotion to the second tier.

Season to season

As CD Berio FT

As Real Sociedad "C"

2 seasons in Segunda División RFEF
8 seasons in Tercera División

Current squad

Reserve team

Out on loan

See also
 :Category:Real Sociedad C footballers
 Real Sociedad
 Real Sociedad B
 Real Sociedad cantera

References

External links
Official website 
La Preferente team profile 
Arefepedia team profile as Berio FT 

Football clubs in the Basque Country (autonomous community)
Real Sociedad
Sports teams in San Sebastián
Association football clubs established in 1998
1998 establishments in Spain
Spanish reserve football teams